Kurmene Parish is an administrative unit of Bauska Municipality in the Semigallia region of Latvia.

Towns, villages and settlements of Kurmene Parish 
Kaijas 
Kurmene
Vērdiņi

Parishes of Latvia
Bauska Municipality
Semigallia